Weaver Poets, Rhyming Weaver Poets and Ulster Weaver Poets were a collective group of poets belonging to an artistic movement who were both influenced by and contemporaries of Robert Burns and the Romantic movement.

Origins
In the late eighteenth century, a number of men involved in the textiles industry, mostly confined to counties Antrim and Down began to submit poems to newspapers and publishers. They were craftsmen and often self-employed. They are known specifically for writing poems in the common tongue of the time for that region, Scots. More often than not, they were working-class and not formally educated.

Some of the more well-known Weaver Poets were James Orr of Ballycarry and David Herbison - The Bard of Dunclug.

Style and form
The style they adopted was the standard Habbie as adopted from a Robert Sempill poem by Robert Fergusson, himself a Scottish weaver, and later by Burns.

Sometimes the poetry produced by the movement was political - Orr had joined the United Irishmen in 1791 and took part in the United Irishmen Rebellion of 1798.

Many weaver poems were collected by poet John Hewitt. Hewitt bequeathed his entire collection to the University of Ulster.

References
Rhyming Weavers, John Hewitt, Belfast 
'History into Poetry, the works of James McKowen (1814-1889) The Bard of Lambeg.' (ed) Fredrick Gilbert Watson, Belfast ISBN 978-0-9932528-5-3

Ulster Scots people
Romanticism
Scots language
Culture of Northern Ireland